Duke Wu of Wey (9th century BCE-?), also known as Ji He, was a Zhou dynasty feudal lord. He was the 11th ruler of Wey and the first Duke of Wey. The late Zhou dynasty historical record Guoyu claims that Duke Wu lived as long as 95 years. However, no other sources support this claim.

Life 
The Records of the Grand Historian briefly noted that He succeeded his father Marquis Xi of Wey, the title was Marquis at the beginning of his rule. When Quanrong overthrown Zhou's rule in Haojing, King Ping of Zhou relocated the capital to Luoyi. Duke Wu aided Zhou by leading his army and confronting with Quanrong. The military merit of Marquis He was recognized by King Ping. The king elevated his rank of nobility to Duke accordingly. He died after 55 years of his rule. His son Duke Zhuang of Wey succeeded him.

Duke Wu's shrine was located in Qi county of Henan Province where the shrine of Shu Feng of Kang can also be found.

Relation with Bo He of Gong 
Bo He of Gong was a figure mentioned by numerous inscriptions as well as other historical sources. However, his identification is not clearly known. The Records of the Grand Historian and the Bamboo Annals both recorded that Bo He exiled King Li of Zhou who was carrying out his reign of terror. Contemporary Chinese historian Gu Jiegang speculate that Duke Wu of Wey was the one who exiled King Li of Zhou in 841 BCE. Duke Wu's name was He, So was the name of Bo He of Gong.

In Literature 
In the earliest collection of Chinese poetry Shih-ching, an ode dedicated to Duke Wu can be found. In the Guó fēng part of Shih Ching, the ode Qi Ao (淇奧) praised Duke Wu for his tolerance of different opinions, his unfaltering desire of learning and his refrain from the abuse of power. In the comment of this ode, the author, like Gu Jiegang, also claimed that Duke Wu was in charge of Zhou dynasty's court at a certain point of time.

This ode was so well known that one of the frase "如切如磋，如琢如磨"(Ruqie Rucuo, Ruzhuo Rumo) entered into the common lexicon of Mandarin Chinese. The word "Qie Cuo"(切磋) in Mandarin means "To Practice", The word Zhuo Mo (琢磨) means "To contemplate". 

If Shih Ching and Gu Jiegang were both true in their claim, the word "Republic/Republican" in Mandarin, Japanese, Korean and Vietnamese "共和" also traces its origin to Duke Wu of Wey.

Additionally, the Minor court Hymns of Shih Ching collected one of Duke Wu's own work. Duke Wu composed the hymn of Bin Zhi Chuyan in order to satirize King You of Zhou's decadent way of life. In the Major court hymns, the hymn of Yi(抑,Refrain), was Duke Wu's production as well. In Yi, he solicited King Ping of Zhou for his prudence in ruling a country.

References 

Monarchs of Wey (state)
Zhou dynasty nobility
Zhou dynasty generals
Zhou dynasty poets
Zhou dynasty politicians